Chen Jin (1446 - 1528),  courtesy name Ruli was a politician of the Ming dynasty.

Life

Chen Jin was born in 1446 in Wuchang (modern day Wuhan, Hubei) to a family of officials; his grandfather was Prefect of Kuizhou (in modern day Chongqing), while his father Chen Lin served as Deputy Commissioner of Guangxi. He entered official service through the imperial examinations in 1472. 

In 1507, he was appointed to his first term as Viceroy of Liangguang, where he managed to suppress a local Zhuang rebellion. He then attempted to open trade with the Zhuang as a means of controlling them, but the rebels continued to raid and kill. In 1508, he was promoted to Minister of Revenue in Nanjing, and in 1511 he was appointed to northern Jiangxi to lead a campaign against local bandits. He won military victories and took bandit forts, using locally recruited troops. His own troops pillaged the locals so much that a local poem went: 

 

In 1515, he was again appointed to be Viceroy of Liangguang and successfully suppressed a pirate rebellion.

References

Ming dynasty politicians
1446 births
1528 deaths
Viceroys of Liangguang
Ming dynasty generals